Cephalostenus is a genus of darkling beetles in the subfamily Tenebrioninae.

References 

 Reitter, E., 1903: Die Arten der Gattung Cephalostenus Sol. Wiener Entomologische Zeitung, 22: 132.

External links 

 
 Cephalostenus at Fauna Europaea

Tenebrioninae
Tenebrionidae genera